Ronald Reagan's first screen credit was the starring role in the 1937 movie Love Is on the Air, and by the end of 1939 he had already appeared in 19 films. In 1938, he starred alongside Jane Wyman in Brother Rat. Before Santa Fe Trail in 1940, Reagan played the role of George Gipp in the film Knute Rockne, All American; from it, he acquired the lifelong nickname "the Gipper". In 1941 exhibitors voted him the fifth most popular star from the younger generation in Hollywood. Reagan's favorite acting role was as a double amputee in 1942's Kings Row, in which he recites the line, "Where's the rest of me?", later used as the title of his 1965 autobiography. Many film critics considered Kings Row to be his best movie, though the film was condemned by The New York Times critic Bosley Crowther.

After the outbreak of war, Reagan, an officer in the Army Reserve, was ordered to active duty in April 1942. Upon the approval of the Army Air Force (AAF), he was transferred to the AAF and was assigned to the First Motion Picture Unit (officially, the 18th AAF Base Unit) in Culver City, California. In January 1943, he was sent to the Provisional Task Force Show Unit of This Is The Army at Burbank, California. He returned to the First Motion Picture Unit after completing this duty and was promoted to Captain. By the end of the war, his units had produced some 400 training films for the AAF. including Beyond the Line of Duty, The Rear Gunner, and This is the Army. Although Reagan considered Kings Row the film that "made me a star", he was unable to capitalize on his success because he was ordered to active duty two months after its release, and never regained the "stardom" which he had previously enjoyed.

Reagan continued his acting career, making films such as The Voice of the Turtle, Bedtime for Bonzo, The Winning Team and Cattle Queen of Montana. Though an early critic of television, Reagan landed fewer film roles in the late 1950s and decided to join the medium. He was hired as the host of General Electric Theater, a series of weekly dramas that became very popular. Eventually, the show's ratings fell off and GE dropped Reagan in 1962. Reagan was awarded a star on the Hollywood Walk of Fame when the walk was dedicated on February 9, 1960.

Film

Television

References

Citations

Works cited

Further reading
McClure, Arthur et al. Ronald Reagan:  A Bibliography of the Movie Years. Lewiston, New York:  Edwin Mellen Press, 1988.
Thomas, Tony.  The Films of Ronald Reagan.  Secaucus, New Jersey:  Citadel Press, 1980.

External links

American filmographies
Male actor filmographies